The International Alphabet of Sanskrit Transliteration (IAST) is a transliteration scheme that allows the lossless romanisation of Indic scripts as employed by Sanskrit and related Indic languages. It is based on a scheme that emerged during the nineteenth century from suggestions by Charles Trevelyan, William Jones, Monier Monier-Williams and other scholars, and formalised by the Transliteration Committee of the Geneva Oriental Congress, in September 1894. IAST makes it possible for the reader to read the Indic text unambiguously, exactly as if it were in the original Indic script. It is this faithfulness to the original scripts that accounts for its continuing popularity amongst scholars.

Usage
Scholars commonly use IAST in publications that cite textual material in Sanskrit, Pāḷi and other classical Indian languages.

IAST is also used for major e-text repositories such as SARIT, Muktabodha, GRETIL, and sanskritdocuments.org.

The IAST scheme represents more than a century of scholarly usage in books and journals on classical Indian studies. By contrast, the ISO 15919 standard for transliterating Indic scripts emerged in 2001 from the standards and library worlds. For the most part, ISO 15919 follows the IAST scheme, departing from it only in minor ways (e.g., ṃ/ṁ and ṛ/r̥)—see comparison below.

The Indian National Library at Kolkata romanization, intended for the romanisation of all Indic scripts, is an extension of IAST.

Inventory and conventions
The IAST letters are listed with their Devanagari equivalents and phonetic values in IPA, valid for Sanskrit, Hindi and other modern languages that use Devanagari script, but some phonological changes have occurred:

* H is actually glottal, not velar.

Some letters are modified with diacritics: Long vowels are marked with an overline. Vocalic (syllabic) consonants, retroflexes and ṣ have an underdot. One letter has an overdot: ṅ. One has an acute accent: ś. One letter has a line below: ḻ (Vedic).

Unlike ASCII-only romanizations such as ITRANS or Harvard-Kyoto, the diacritics used for IAST allow capitalization of proper names.

Comparison with ISO 15919
For the most part, IAST is a subset of ISO 15919 that merges the retroflex (underdotted) liquids with the vocalic ones (ringed below) and the short close-mid vowels with the long ones. The following seven exceptions are from the ISO standard accommodating an extended repertoire of symbols to allow transliteration of Devanāgarī and other Indic scripts, as used for languages other than Sanskrit.

Computer input by alternative keyboard layout
The most convenient method of inputting romanized Sanskrit is by setting up an alternative keyboard layout. This allows one to hold a modifier key to type letters with diacritical marks.  For example,  = ā.  How this is set up varies by operating system.

Linux/Unix and BSD desktop environments allow one to set up custom keyboard layouts and switch them by clicking a flag icon in the menu bar.

macOS One can use the pre-installed US International keyboard, or install Toshiya Unebe's Easy Unicode keyboard layout.

Microsoft Windows 
Windows also allows one to change keyboard layouts and set up additional custom keyboard mappings for IAST. This Pali keyboard installer made by Microsoft Keyboard Layout Creator (MSKLC) supports IAST (works on Microsoft Windows up to at least version 10, can use Alt button on the right side of the keyboard instead of Ctrl+Alt combination).

Computer input by selection from a screen

Many systems provide a way to select Unicode characters visually. ISO/IEC 14755 refers to this as a screen-selection entry method.

Microsoft Windows has provided a Unicode version of the Character Map program (find it by hitting  then type charmap then hit ) since version NT 4.0 – appearing in the consumer edition since XP. This is limited to characters in the Basic Multilingual Plane (BMP). Characters are searchable by Unicode character name, and the table can be limited to a particular code block. More advanced third-party tools of the same type are also available (a notable freeware example is BabelMap).

macOS provides a "character palette" with much the same functionality, along with searching by related characters, glyph tables in a font, etc. It can be enabled in the input menu in the menu bar under System Preferences → International → Input Menu (or System Preferences → Language and Text → Input Sources) or can be viewed under Edit → Emoji & Symbols in many programs.

Equivalent tools – such as gucharmap (GNOME) or kcharselect (KDE) – exist on most Linux desktop environments.

Users of SCIM on Linux based platforms can also have the opportunity to install and use the sa-itrans-iast input handler which provides complete support for the ISO 15919 standard for the romanization of Indic languages as part of the m17n library.

Font support 

Only certain fonts support all the Latin Unicode characters essential for the transliteration of Indic scripts according to the ISO 15919 standard. For example, the Arial, Tahoma and Times New Roman font packages that come with Microsoft Office 2007 and later versions also support precomposed Unicode characters like ā, ḍ, ḥ, ī, ḷ, ḹ, ṃ, ñ, ṅ, ṇ, ṛ, ṝ, ṣ, ś, ṭ, ḻ and ū, glyphs for some of which are only to be found in the Latin Extended Additional Unicode block. The majority of other text fonts commonly used for book production are defective in their support for one or more characters from this block. Accordingly, many academics working in the area of Sanskrit studies now make use of free and open-source software like LibreOffice, instead of Microsoft Word, in conjunction with free OpenType fonts like FreeSerif or Gentium, both of which have complete support for the full repertoire of conjoined diacritics in the IAST character set. Released under the GNU FreeFont or SIL Open Font License, respectively, such  fonts may be freely shared and do not require the person reading or editing a document to purchase proprietary software to make use of its  associated fonts.

See also

 Devanagari transliteration
 Āryabhaṭa numeration
 Hunterian transliteration
 Harvard-Kyoto
 ITRANS
 National Library at Kolkata romanisation
 ISO 15919
 Shiva Sutras
 Template:IAST

 [  ]

References

External links 
 
 

Hindustani orthography
Romanization of Brahmic
Sanskrit transliteration
Encodings